Kaliyuga Pandavulu is a 1986 Indian Telugu-language masala film produced by D. Ramanaidu under Suresh Productions, and directed by K. Raghavendra Rao. It stars Ramanaidu's son Venkatesh and Khushbu (making their cinematic debut), with music composed by Chakravarthy. The film was a box office hit, and was remade in Kannada in 1989 as Poli Huduga. Venkatesh won the Nandi Special Jury Award for his Debut acting.

Plot 
Vijay, son of Chakrapani, a multimillionaire, has a lot of arrogance and pride, he plays a lot of mischief in college with his three friends. Bharathi, a middle-class girl studies in the same college. Even though Vijay teases Bharathi many times, even then she protects his life once, which changes his entire lifestyle and he falls in love with her. He wants to marry Bharathi, but his father doesn't agree, he traps Bharathi and proves her as a prostitute in the court with the help of a gang: MLA Eekambaram, Dr. Vaayunandan Rao, S. I. Aagreya Murthy, Lawyer Jalandhar, Bhudevi along with Bharathi's brother-in-law Bhairava Murthy who wants to marry her, on that reason Bharathi's father Jaganatham commits suicide and Bharathi goes away. Vijay quarrels with his father, leaves the house, and searches for Bharathi, he learns that Bharathi is with her elder sister Krishnaveni and they are under the protection of Retired Army Officer Bhishmanarayan and he also discovers that Krishnaveni is also cheated by Dr. Vaayunandan Rao and sent to jail by MLA Eekambaram and gang only.

Bhishmanarayan inspires Vijay, with his inspiration Vijay and his three friends, along with Bharathi form a revolutionary team in the name of Kaliyuga Pandavulu and fight against all anti-social elements and illegal activities in the society. Finally, Vijay catches all the real criminals and presents them in an open court, Chakrapani also realizes and admits his mistake. Vijay proves that Bharathi is innocent and they all continue their mission Kaliyuga Pandavulu.

Cast 

 Venkatesh as Vijay
 Khushbu as Bharathi
 Surya as Bhatha
 Chitti Babu as Bhaskar
 Saritha as Krishnaveni
 Aswini as Meku
 Rao Gopal Rao as Chakrapani
 Nutan Prasad as MLA Eekambaram
 Ranganath as Bhishmanarayan
 Rallapalli as Chakrapani's brother-in-law
 Shakti Kapoor as Karamchand
 Radha Ravi as Bhairava Murthy
 Rajeev as Dr.Vaayunandan Rao
 Narra Venkateswara Rao as Lawyer Jalandhar
 Chalapathi Rao as S. I. Aagreya Murthy
 J. V. Somayajulu as Judge
 P. J. Sarma as I.G.
 P. L. Narayana as Jaganatham
 Mikkilineni as D.I.G.
 K.K.Sarma as Compounder Narayana
 Chidatala Appa Rao as Hotel Manager
 Mada Venkateswara Rao
 Jayanthi as Rajeswari
 Rama Prabha as Chakrapani's sister
 Kalpana Rai
 Y. Vijaya as Bhudevi

Soundtrack 
Music composed by Chakravarthy. Lyrics written by Veturi.

References

External links 
 

1980s masala films
1980s Telugu-language films
1986 films
Films directed by K. Raghavendra Rao
Films scored by K. Chakravarthy
Films with screenplays by the Paruchuri brothers
Suresh Productions films
Telugu films remade in other languages